Dendrochilum anfractum is a species of orchid, commonly known as the bent dendrochilum, endemic to Philippines.

References

External links 

anfractum
Orchids of the Philippines